This is a list of players from Taiwan in Major League Baseball. There have been 16 players total from Taiwan. Those players, especially star pitcher Chien-Ming Wang, became household names of Taiwanese people and induced huge followings for their games during MLB seasons. In November 2011, the inaugural MLB Taiwan All-Star Series was played in five games at three ballparks across Taiwan during the postseason. Wang and Fu-Te Ni were called up by the Chinese Taipei national baseball team against the MLB All-Star team. All Taiwanese players who have appeared in Major League Baseball began their professional baseball careers in the United States by signing with teams as an international free agent. The first Taiwanese baseball player to be selected and signed via the Major League Baseball draft process was Lyle Lin, who was drafted in the fourteenth round of the 2019 Major League Baseball draft, and signed with the Arizona Diamondbacks.

Active players
Included in this table are players who are on, or have been on, an active MLB roster during the current MLB season (or, during the offseason, players who were on an active MLB roster during the most recently completed MLB season). Players are ordered by the date of the MLB debut.

* Games played through the 2022 regular season.

Former players
Listed below are previous players in MLB, ordered by the date of their final MLB appearance.

All-Star Game selections 

Bold indicates the player was selected to the starting roster

Postseason appearances

References
 Players born in Taiwan - Baseball-Reference.com

 
Taiwan